Series 46 of University Challenge began on 11 July 2016 on BBC Two, and finished on 10 April 2017. This series of the long running quiz show drew larger audiences than usual thanks to a collection of interesting characters, most notably Eric Monkman from Wolfson College, Cambridge, who has been described on Twitter by many viewers as "the most intense contestant ever".

Results
Winning teams are highlighted in bold.
Teams with green scores (winners) returned in the next round, while those with red scores (losers) were eliminated.
Teams with orange scores had to win one more match to return in the next round.
Teams with yellow scores indicate that two further matches had to be played and won (teams that lost their first quarter-final match).
A score in italics indicates a match decided on a tie-breaker question.

First round

Highest Scoring Losers play-offs

Second round

Quarter-finals

Semi-finals

Final

 The trophy and title were awarded to the Balliol College, Oxford team comprising Freddy Potts, Jacob Lloyd, Joey Goldman and Benjamin Pope.
 The trophy was presented by Stephen Hawking, on location at Gonville and Caius College, Cambridge.

Spin-off: Christmas Special 2016

Qualification round 
Each year, a Christmas special sequence is aired featuring distinguished alumni. Out of 7 first-round winners, the top 4 highest-scoring teams progress to the semi-finals. The teams consist of celebrities who represent their alma maters.
 Teams with green scores won their match and achieved a high enough score to return in the next round, teams with red scores lost and were eliminated.
 Teams with grey scores won their first round match but did not achieve a high enough score to return.

Standings for the winners

Semi-finals

Final

The winning St Hilda's College, Oxford team consisted of Fiona Caldicott, Daisy Dunn, Val McDermid and Adèle Geras beat the University of Leeds and their team of Louise Doughty, Gus Unger-Hamilton, Kamal Ahmed and Steve Bell.

References

External links
University Challenge homepage
Blanchflower Results Table

2016
2016 British television seasons
2017 British television seasons